Sastra Robotics is a Kochi based robotics company that makes industrial robotic manipulators. Established in 2013, Sastra won the TiE50 Award  by TiE Silicon Valley in 2017. Sastra was first located in Kochi Startup Village and later moved to its own office space. It was selected for The Indus Entrepreneurs' AnthahPrerana accelerator program and the International Institute of Information Technology, Hyderabad's accelerator program, Avishkar. Sastra was founded by Aronin P (CEO), Achu Wilson (CTO) and Akhil A (COO). Kamath Raveendranath, CFO of Next Education India and Amitava Roy, former COO of Tech Mahindra are some of its investors and advisors.

References

External links 
 Official website

Technology companies of India
Robotics companies
Companies based in Kochi
Indian companies established in 2013
2013 establishments in Kerala
Technology companies established in 2013